Carmelo Cedrún Ochandátegui (born 6 December 1930) is a Spanish former football goalkeeper and manager.

Club career
Born in Amorebieta-Etxano, Cedrún started playing professionally with local giants Athletic Bilbao, making his first-team debut on 15 April 1951 in a 3–0 home win against Sevilla FC and quickly becoming first-choice. In the 1955–56 season, as the Basques won La Liga, he only conceded 31 goals while playing all 30 matches, and appeared in more than 400 official games during his 14-year spell.

In 1964, having lost his place to another future club legend, José Ángel Iribar, Cedrún joined RCD Español also of the top division, again returning to starting duties. He retired at 38 in the United States, with the Baltimore Bays.

Mere months after retiring, Cedrún took a hand at coaching, starting in his region with lowly SCD Durango and Barakaldo CF. Most of his career was spent in the lower leagues, his only top flight experience coming in the 1976–77 campaign with RC Celta de Vigo, with the team ranking second from the bottom.

International career
Cedrún earned 13 caps for the Spain national team, his debut coming on 14 March 1954 as the nation battled with Turkey for a spot at the 1954 FIFA World Cup; Spain won 4–2 on aggregate (rule did not apply at the time) and, after a draw in the third match, lost after a drawing of lots.

Cedrún was then selected for the 1962 World Cup, playing two games out of three as the country exited in the group stage.

Personal life
Cedrún's son, Andoni, was also a footballer – and a goalkeeper. He too represented Athletic but with little success, appearing mostly for Real Zaragoza in another lengthy career.

His grandson, Markel Areitio, is also a goalkeeper.

Honours
Athletic Bilbao
La Liga: 1955–56
Copa del Generalísimo: 1955, 1956, 1958

See also
 List of Athletic Bilbao players (+200 appearances)
 List of La Liga players (400+ appearances)

References

External links

Biography at Porteros Vascos de Leyenda 

1930 births
Living people
People from Amorebieta-Etxano
Sportspeople from Biscay
Spanish footballers
Footballers from the Basque Country (autonomous community)
Association football goalkeepers
La Liga players
SD Amorebieta footballers
Athletic Bilbao footballers
RCD Espanyol footballers
North American Soccer League (1968–1984) players
Baltimore Bays players
Spain B international footballers
Spain international footballers
1962 FIFA World Cup players
Basque Country international footballers
Spanish expatriate footballers
Expatriate soccer players in the United States
Spanish football managers
La Liga managers
Segunda División managers
Segunda División B managers
Barakaldo CF managers
CD Logroñés managers
Cultural Leonesa managers
RC Celta de Vigo managers
Real Murcia managers
Real Jaén managers